Thylactus umbilicatus is a species of beetle in the family Cerambycidae. It was described by Karl-Ernst Hüdepohl in 1990.

References

Xylorhizini
Beetles described in 1990